Vahadenia is a genus of flowering plants in the family Apocynaceae, first described as a genus in 1902. It is native to tropical Africa.

Species
 Vahadenia caillei (A.Chev.) Stapf ex Hutch. & Dalziel - Guinea, Ivory Coast, Sierra Leone 
 Vahadenia laurentii (De Wild.) Stapf - Nigeria, Cameroon, Gabon, Republic of Congo, Central African Republic, Zaire, Angola

References

Apocynaceae genera
Rauvolfioideae